Azure Power Global Limited is an independent power producer, a developer and an operator of utility and commercial scale solar PV power plants headquartered in New Delhi, India. The company was founded in 2008 by Inderpreet Wadhwa. The company sells energy to government utilities, and independent industrial and commercial customers in India. Azure Power developed India's first utility scale solar project in 2009 in Awan, Punjab.  Azure Power has a total capacity of more than 7 GW.

History
The company was founded by Inderpreet Wadhwa in 2008. Azure Power’s 2 MW Punjab facility was the first utility-scale solar power plant in India in 2009. The project provides electricity to 32 villages 20,000 people in Awan, Punjab.  Azure Power has raised capital from investors like Foundation Capital, Helion Ventures, IFC and German development bank DEG. The company's largest shareholder is Caisse de dépôt et placement du Québec (also known as CDPQ), which owns over 50% of the shares outstanding. Azure Power has a total capacity of over 7.4 GW across.

People
 Rupesh Agarwal: Acting CEO
R Narasimhan Iyer: COO 
Pawan Kumar Agrawal: CFO

Technology
In November 2011, Azure Power was awarded the US Department of Commerce’s Export Achievement Certificate, at SolarCon, Hyderabad. In August 2012, Hanwha Q Cells Co., the South Korean solar panel manufacturer, tied up with Azure Power to invest and build a Solar Plant in India to generate enough electricity to supply 18,000 homes. In 2014, Azure Power selected Accenture to implement an SAP Enterprise Resource Planning (ERP) solution to support and drive growth in its solar generation business. As part of the agreement, Accenture provides implementation services in support of the SAP solution to Azure Power to help strengthen its business processes and improve planning, budgeting, forecasting, supply chain and revenue projections.

IPO
On 12 October 2016, Azure Power launched an Initial Public Offering (IPO), the first time an Indian energy company had been listed on the New York Stock Exchange. Azure Power raised approximately US$161 million as part of its pre-IPO, initial public offering and concurrent private placement.

Green bond 
In August 2017, Azure Power issued an inaugural green bond offering, maturing in 2022. The bond was certified by Climate Bonds Initiative as green bond and was the first solar green bond to be offered by a company with only solar power assets out of India. In 2019, the company issued a second green bond offering of USD$350.

See also
 Solar power in India
 Solar Energy Corporation of India
 Tata Power Solar

References

Solar energy companies of India
Indian companies established in 2008
Companies based in New Delhi
Companies listed on the New York Stock Exchange
Energy companies established in 2008
Renewable resource companies established in 2008